Municipal elections were held in Estonia on 18 October 2009, with advance voting between 8 and 14 October 2009.

The result was a victory for Estonian Centre Party.

Results

References

Local elections in Estonia
Estonia
2009 in Estonia